Bundle or Bundling may refer to:

 Bundling (packaging), the process of using straps to bundle up items

Biology
 Bundle of His, a collection of heart muscle cells specialized for electrical conduction
 Bundle of Kent, an extra conduction pathway between the atria and ventricles in the heart
 Hair bundle, a group of cellular processes resembling hair, characteristic of a hair cell

Computing
 Bundle (OS X), a type of directory in NEXTSTEP and OS X
 Bundle (software distribution), a package containing a software and everything it needs to operate
 Bundle adjustment, a photogrammetry/computer vision technique

Economics
 Bundled payment, a method for reimbursing health care providers
 Product bundling, a marketing strategy that involves offering several products for sale as one combined product

Mathematics and engineering
 Bundle (mathematics), a generalization of a fiber bundle dropping the condition of a local product structure
 Bundle conductor (power engineering)
 Fiber bundle, a topology space that looks locally like a product space
 Optical fiber bundle, a cable consisting of a collection of fiber optics

Music
 Bundles (album), a 1975 album by Soft Machine, including a song of the same title
 The Bundles, an anti-folk supergroup
 The Bundles (album), a 2010 album by the group

Politics
 Bundling (fundraising), when donations from many individuals are collected by one person and presented to the recipient
 Bundling (public choice), a similar concept to product bundling that occurs in electoral republics

Law
 Bundle of rights (property law)
 Bundling (antitrust law), setting the total price of several products or services from one seller

Other uses
 Bundle Brent, an Agatha Christie character
 Bundle theory, in philosophy
 Bundling (tradition), the traditional practice of wrapping one person in a bed accompanied by his/her courter
 Sacred bundle, a wrapped collection of sacred items held by a designated carrier in Indigenous American cultures

See also